Gregory John Stewart (born May 21, 1986) is a Canadian former professional ice hockey left winger. Stewart was born in Kitchener, Ontario.

Playing career
Stewart was drafted in the eighth round, 246th overall in the 2004 NHL Entry Draft by the Montreal Canadiens from the Peterborough Petes of the Ontario Hockey League (OHL). On May 30, 2006, Greg signed a three-year entry level contract with the Canadiens. Stewart made his professional debut in the 2006–07 playing the full season with the Cincinnati Cyclones of the ECHL.

In the 2007–08 season, Stewart was assigned to AHL affiliate, the Hamilton Bulldogs, for the majority of the year posting 10 goals in 69 games. On April 2, 2008, he was recalled from the Bulldogs and played his first NHL game on April 5, 2008, in the last game of the regular season against the Toronto Maple Leafs.

Demoted after 5 games with the Canadiens to the Bulldogs in the 2009–10 season. Appearing in 45 games with the Bulldogs for 10 points, Stewart was then loaned to the Chicago Wolves in exchange for Michael Vernace on March 10, 2010.

On July 16, 2010, Stewart signed as a free agent with the Edmonton Oilers to a one-year contract. Stewart played his first pre-season game for Edmonton on September 21, 2010. He scored the game-winning goal, as the Oilers defeated the Vancouver Canucks 3-2.

Career statistics

References

External links

1986 births
Living people
Canadian ice hockey defencemen
Belfast Giants players
Chicago Wolves players
Cincinnati Cyclones (ECHL) players
Hamilton Bulldogs (AHL) players
Ice hockey people from Ontario
Sportspeople from Kitchener, Ontario
Montreal Canadiens draft picks
Montreal Canadiens players
Oklahoma City Barons players
Peterborough Petes (ice hockey) players
Canadian expatriate ice hockey players in Northern Ireland
Canadian expatriate ice hockey players in the United States